Every year since 1975, the final stage of the Tour de France has concluded on the Champs-Élysées, an emblematic street of the city of Paris. As the final stage of the most recognised bike race in the world, winning it is considered very prestigious.

The stage typically starts on the outskirts of Paris, and teams agree  on a truce for the opening portion of the race, with cyclists taking the opportunity to have a moment of tranquility, laughing, and celebrating the achievement of finishing the Tour de France. The rider leading the general classification - whose lead is by custom not contested on the final stage, though usually it is by that point unassailable - poses for photographs, often taking a glass of champagne on the way.

The second part of the race is more hotly contested. This consists of between six and ten laps of a circuit of the Champs-Élysées, a wide partly-cobblestoned road. Riders try to break away from the peloton to secure victory, though as of 2020 such attempts have only resulted in a victory on six occasions (and on only three since 1979). On the other occasions (except 1989, when the final stage was a time-trial), the winner has come from a mass sprint and has therefore typically been a specialist sprinter. At times this means that the final stage has settled the points classification, which is usually won by a sprinter.

Between 2014 and 2016, the course was also used for La Course by Le Tour de France, a women's one-day race. The first edition of Tour de France Femmes in 2022 also used the course, as the first stage of the race.

History
In the first Tour of 1903, the finish was at Ville-d'Avray. From 1904 to 1967 it was at the Parc des Princes track and from 1968 to 1974, during the heyday of Eddy Merckx, at the Vélodrome de Vincennes.

In 1974, Félix Lévitan, co-director of the Tour, and reporter Yves Mourousi suggested a finish on the Champs-Élysées. Mourousi directly contacted French President Valéry Giscard d'Estaing to obtain permission. The first stage took place in 1975: this was a Paris-Paris  stage of 25 laps. The Belgian Walter Godefroot won the sprint and Bernard Thévenet received the yellow jersey from the hands of Valéry Giscard d'Estaing. In 1977, French Alain Meslet became the first rider to win alone.

Since 1978, the final stage has generally started from outside the city, with only the final part of the stage following the core route. The number of laps has varied between six and ten. Major innovations have generally been avoided, with the notable exception of the 1989 stage which operated as a time-trial.

In 2013, in celebration of the 100th Tour de France the stage was shifted to a late afternoon start, finishing in the evening. The course also entered the Champs Elysées via the courtyards of the Louvre Palace, passing directly by the Louvre Pyramid, and utilising the traffic circle around the Arc de Triomphe rather than making a u-turn short of it; these changes have been retained in subsequent years. In 2015, bad weather caused the Tour organisers to declare the overall classification neutralised upon entry to the Champs-Élysées,  before the stage finished.

The course was also used for the first three editions of La Course by Le Tour de France, a women's one-day race held between 2014 and 2021. In these years the race was held in a kermesse-style circuit racing format. The first edition of Tour de France Femmes in 2022 will also use the course as the first stage of an 8 day race.

Arrivals

Due to the high profile of the last day as well as its setting, the stage is prestigious. The overall Tour placings are typically settled before the final stage, so the racing is often for the glory of finishing the Tour and, at times, to settle the points classification. The leader of the Tour de France is, by convention, not challenged for their lead on this final day. Traditionally, the stage starts with champagne served by the race leader's team, on-the-road photo opportunities and joking around.

As the riders approach Paris, the racing heats up as the sprinters and their teams begin the real racing of the day. When the riders reach central Paris, they enter the Champs-Élysées riding up the Rue de Rivoli, on to the Place de la Concorde and then swing right on to the Champs-Élysées itself. The riders ride now a total of eight laps (including around the Arc de Triomphe, down the Champs-Élysées, round les Tuileries and the Louvre and across the Place de la Concorde back to the Champs-Élysées). In past Tours, the riders would complete ten laps before the Tour was over.

When a rider has reached a significant milestone over the course of the concluding Tour, it is customary for the peloton to let him enter the Champs-Elysées section of the stage in first place. Such an honor was bestowed upon American George Hincapie in 2012, in recognition of his final and record setting 17th Tour de France.

While a number of riders will try to pull away from the peloton on the Champs-Elysées, chances of success are slim and these attempts are often seen as one last opportunity for teams to showcase their colors. It is extremely hard for a small group to resist the push of chasing sprinter's teams on the stage's flat circuit, even more so than in a linear race, and the overwhelming majority have ended in a mass sprint.

In early years, breakaway wins did not appear uncommon. A surprising three straight occurred between 1977 and 1979. However, with the advent of modern racing tactics, the feat has become very rare, lending an increasingly valued place in Tour lore to the few who have achieved it. Those are Frenchmen Alain Meslet (1977), Bernard Hinault (1979) and Eddy Seigneur (1994), Dutchman Gerrie Knetemann (1978), American Jeff Pierce (1987), and Kazakhstani Alexander Vinokourov (2005).

General classification
Although generally uncontested, there have been two occasions on which the last stage saw attacks on the leading position in the general classification. In 1979, Joop Zoetemelk was 3:07 behind Bernard Hinault before the final stage. Zoetemelk attacked on the last stage, hoping to win enough time to claim the victory. Hinault chased Zoetemelk, and beat him for the stage victory.

In 1989, Greg LeMond beat Laurent Fignon by 58 seconds over a 24 km time trial from Versailles. In doing so, he closed a 50-second gap to win the 1989 Tour de France by eight seconds. It was the first (and only) time trial final stage on the Champs-Élysées. The 1964, 1965 and 1967 Tours finished with time trials to the Parc des Princes, and the 1968 to 1971 stages had time trials to the Vélodrome de Vincennes (Cipale).

In 2005, Lance Armstrong had a comfortable lead in the general classification, but behind him Alexander Vinokourov and Levi Leipheimer were only two seconds apart, on fifth and sixth place. Vinokourov succeeded in a breakaway during the last kilometre and, because of his stage win and bonus seconds, overtook Leipheimer for fifth position overall. As of 2022, this is the last time the stage was not decided in a bunch sprint.

Points classification
In some years, the points classification was decided on that last stage.

In 1984, Frank Hoste had been leading the points classification for most of the race, but Sean Kelly had taken over the lead on the penultimate stage, with a difference of 4 points. Hoste ended third in the last stage against Kelly fifth, which made Hoste the winner by 4 points.

In the final stages of the 1987 Tour de France, the lead in the points classification switched between Jean-Paul van Poppel and Stephen Roche. Before the final stage, Roche was leading by 17 points, but during the last stage Van Poppel won back 16 points by intermediate sprints. Van Poppel's ninth place in the stage was then enough to win the points classification by 16 points.

In 1991, Djamolidine Abdoujaparov clipped his wheels on barriers. With less than 100m left he tumbled head-over-heels in a spectacular crash. After he regained consciousness, he was helped across the line to clinch the sprinters' competition.

In 2001, Stuart O'Grady had been leading the points classification for most of the race, but Erik Zabel overtook him at the final moment.

In 2003, the green jersey was settled by a close finish between Baden Cooke and Robbie McEwen finishing 2nd and 3rd respectively, that resulted in Cooke finished with 216 points to McEwen's 214.

Winners

References

External links

Cycling in Paris
International sports competitions hosted by Paris
Champs-Élysées